NGC 495, also occasionally referred to as PGC 5037, UGC 920 or GC 278, is a barred spiral galaxy in the constellation Pisces. It is located approximately 184 million light-years from the Solar System and was discovered on 12 September 1784 by astronomer William Herschel.

Observation history 
The object was discovered by Herschel along with NGC 496 and NGC 499. He initially described the discovery as "Three [NGC 495 along with NGC 496 and 499], eS and F, forming a triangle.". As he observed the trio again the next night, he was able to make out more detail: "Three, forming a [right triangle]; the [right angle] to the south NGC 499, the short leg preceding [NGC 495], the long towards the north [NGC 496].  Those in the legs [NGC 495 and 496] the faintest imaginable; that at the rectangle [NGC 499] a deal larger and brighter, but still very faint."

NGC 495 was later also observed by Heinrich d'Arrest and Herman Schultz who first noted the object's accurate position. This position is also noted in the New General Catalogue.

Description 
John Dreyer, creator of the New General Catalogue, uses Herschel's initial notation to describe the position of NGC 495 ("very faint, small, 1st of 3").

Modern observations however call NGC 495 a bright central galaxy with an apparent size of about 1.2' by 0.8'. It also includes fainter outer extensions, about 2.6' by 1.5'. The galaxy is also classified as a barred spiral galaxy of Hubble type SB0-a.

See also 
 Barred Spiral Galaxy 
 List of NGC objects (1–1000)
 Pisces (constellation)

References

External links 

 
 SEDS

Spiral galaxies
Pisces (constellation)
0495
5037
Astronomical objects discovered in 1784
Discoveries by William Herschel
920